The 5 Mrs. Buchanans is an American television sitcom that aired on CBS from September 24, 1994 to March 25, 1995. Set in the fictional town of Mercy, Indiana, the show centers on the small-town misadventures of four diverse women with one thing in common: their loathing for their monster of a mother-in-law.

Overview
The unofficial leader of the group is Alexandria (Judith Ivey), a Jewish, 1970s crusader from New York City, who settled down and had a son, Chris, soon after marrying future high school principal Roy Buchanan (John Getz). Everyone regularly convenes in their home and at the thrift store that she owns. Vivian (Harriet Sansom Harris) is trapped in a stagnant marriage to used car salesman Ed Buchanan (Richard Poe), which is exacerbated by their hellion twin sons, Lyndon and PJ. Delilah (Beth Broderick) is a sweet, ditsy former Texas stripper who fell in love with church preacher Rev. Charles Buchanan (Mark Moses). These ladies are pulled together for various family and social functions, and they've forged deep bonds despite their distinctively different personalities. New to the family is Bree (Charlotte Ross), a Californian and former Disneyland employee who had a whirlwind romance with Jesse Buchanan (Tommy Hinkley) during his vacation at the theme park. And always meddling in their lives is Mother Emma Buchanan (Eileen Heckart), a gravelly-voiced, stoic, passive-aggressive gargoyle of a woman who commands the ceaseless devotion and adoration of her four sons.

Cast

Main
 Judith Ivey as Alexandria "Alex" Isaacson Buchanan – A former feminist from a Jewish family in New York City, she owns an antique store. She is married to Roy Buchanan, the eldest son and they have a grown son, Chris. She is the oldest of the four women, and usually the most level-headed and mature. Her relationship with Mother Buchanan ranges from the civil, to absolute hatred, which, when coupled with snide remarks on both parts, makes for an amusing battleground.
 Beth Broderick as Delilah Buchanan – Originally from Corpus Christi, Texas, she is portrayed as a blonde stereotype: ditzy, usually wearing lots of makeup and revealing clothing. She is married to Rev. Charles Buchanan, the preacher, and becomes Head of the Ladies Auxiliary. Her dimness often evokes exasperation in the other women, however, she maintains a close relationship with each. Her past as a stripper often causes obstacles, but her caring nature serves to resolve them.
 Harriet Sansom Harris as Vivian Buchanan – A Republican housewife with hooligan twin sons, Lyndon and PJ from her marriage to her high school sweetheart, Ed Buchanan, she is shown as being rather neurotic, and narcissistic. She sometimes clashes with the politically liberal Alex but they generally get along. Her extreme antics (such as selling pints of her own blood to buy a dress for a Dan Quayle dinner) are often a point of humor. Her relationship with Mother Buchanan is shown to be the most antagonistic.
 Charlotte Ross as Bree Larson Buchanan – A Californian and ex-Disneyland worker, her whirlwind romance and marriage to Jesse Buchanan serves as the opening of the series. Characterized as quite naive and childish, she displays overt vanity, which, when coupled with her superb performance skills and fascination with dead bodies, makes for comedy. Eventually becoming a core part of the family, she succeeds in gaining the ladies' respect by standing with them against Mother Buchanan.
 Eileen Heckart as "Mother" Emma Buchanan – A former aspiring doctor who was forced to raise her four sons alone after her husband left her for a younger woman. She uses this as a vehicle to fuel her manipulation and dislike of her daughters-in-law to the point of buying them fake engagement rings to save money. While she is displayed as the hardened and merciless matriarch, her compassionate side is shown throughout the series, proving that under her tough exterior, she is ultimately a mother, something to which all the women can relate.

Recurring
 John Getz as Roy Buchanan
 Mark Moses as Rev. Charles Buchanan
 Richard Poe as Ed Buchanan
 Tommy Hinkley as Jesse Buchanan (episodes 2–15; played by Paul Johansson in the pilot)

Episodes

The 5 Mrs. Buchanans regularly aired on Saturday nights on CBS, though one episode of the series aired as part of CBS's Monday night comedy lineup, and another episode aired on a Wednesday.

Production

The show was titled The Four Mrs. Buchanans in the original series pilot, referring to only the four daughters-in-law. The opening scene was completely revised and reshot and a pair of jokes about Delilah's skimpy dress were replaced with alternate one-liners about her heavy makeup when the pilot was broadcast as The 5 Mrs. Buchanans.

With an initial series order of 13 episodes, shortly after its premiere CBS announced it had given the series a five-episode pick-up. However, only 17 episodes were aired and are known to have been produced.

Eileen Heckart stated in an interview at the time that CBS had picked up more episodes of the show with the intention of moving it from Saturday nights, where it was faltering, to Mondays following Murphy Brown. The network ultimately changed its mind after ordering Cybill as a mid-season replacement, though the seventh episode of The 5 Mrs. Buchanans did air once in this timeslot as a "special preview" on October 31, 1994.

References

External links
 
 

CBS original programming
English-language television shows
Television series by 20th Century Fox Television
1990s American sitcoms
1994 American television series debuts
1995 American television series endings
Television shows set in Indiana